Soak City may refer to:

Froster Soak City, a water park in Toronto, Canada
Soak City (Valleyfair), a water park at Valleyfair in Shakopee, Minnesota
Soak City (Kings Dominion), a water park at Kings Dominion in Doswell, Virginia
Soak City (Kings Island), a water park at Kings Island in Mason, Ohio
Knott's Soak City, a water park in Buena Park, California
Cedar Point Shores, a water park adjacent to Cedar Point in Sandusky, Ohio formerly known as Soak City
Wet'n'Wild Palm Springs, formerly Knott's Soak City
Sesame Place (San Diego), formerly Knott's Soak City